Bernard Schilling (born in 1914 in Somborn) was a German clergyman and bishop for the Roman Catholic Diocese of Goroka. He was appointed bishop in 1959. He died in 1992.

References 

1914 births
1992 deaths
German Roman Catholic bishops
Roman Catholic bishops of Goroka
20th-century German Roman Catholic priests